Maciel is a district located in the north western part of the Caazapá Department of Paraguay.

Location
The district is located in the north western part of the department and shares border with two districts of Caazapá (Caazapá and Doctor Moisés S. Bertoni), one of the Paraguarí Department (Mbuyapey) and two of the Guairá Department (Borja and Iturbe).

Population
At the 2002 census Maciel had a population of 3,957, an increase of 0.4% since 1992.

References

How to get here
It is located only 10 km away from the city of Caazapá, where one can get taking the national route number 8.

Populated places in the Caazapá Department